John FitzPatrick, 2nd Earl of Upper Ossory FRS DL (2 May 1745 – 13 February 1818), styled 'Lord Gowran' from 1751 to 1758, was an Irish peer and member of parliament.

Biography

John FitzPatrick was born on 2 May 1745, the son of John FitzPatrick, 1st Earl of Upper Ossory, and Lady Evelyn (née Leveson-Gower; daughter of John Leveson-Gower, 1st Earl Gower). He had a younger brother Richard, who also became a noted statesman and soldier, and two younger sisters, Mary and Louisa.

He succeeded to his father's title of earl of Upper Ossory in 1758 but as this was a title in the Irish peerage it did not entitle him to a seat in the British House of Lords. In 1767 he was instead elected to the House of Commons for Bedfordshire, a seat he held until 1794. He was also Lord Lieutenant of Bedfordshire from 1771 to 1818. In 1794, he was given the title of 'Baron Upper Ossory', of Ampthill in the County of Bedford, in the Peerage of Great Britain, which gave him a seat in the House of Lords.

In 1763, Fitzpatrick was in Italy with the bibliophile, Topham Beauclerk; where he bought old-master paintings and commissioned paintings from Gavin Hamilton. His is also thought to have been a patron of John Higton, given his depiction of "Dogs at Ampthill Park" in 1810.

On returning to Britain, Fitzpatrick embarked on an affair with Anne Fitzroy, wife of Prime Minister Augustus Fitzroy, 3rd Duke of Grafton, (and daughter of Henry Liddell, 1st Baron Ravensworth). This resulted in the Prime Minister having an affair with Anne Parsons, a courtesan, the birth of a child, the duchess's divorce and her marriage to FitzPatrick in 1769. Like his younger brother Richard, Fitzpatrick was a friend of Charles James Fox, whilst their half-sister Mary FitzPatrick had married Charles James Fox's older brother Stephen Fox, 2nd Baron Holland. As such Fitzpatrick became step-father to Henry Vassall-Fox, 3rd Baron Holland on the death of his parents. He was also a noted friend to Horace Walpole; a large volume of correspondence between Walpole and Fitzpatrick's wife, the Countess of Upper Ossory survives.

John Fitzpatrick died in February 1818, aged 72, when his titles became extinct. His natural son, John, succeeded to parts of his estates and was given the title of Baron Castletown in 1869; however on his death his estate was inherited by his step-son Henry Vassall-Fox, 3rd Baron Holland - who also adopted Ampthill Park as his seat. Fermyn Woods Hall, inherited from his father, passed to his daughters.

References

External links

John FitzPatrick at www.thepeerage.com
The Fitzpatricks - Earls of Upper Ossory
Fitzpatrick - Mac Giolla Phádraig Clan Society

1745 births
1818 deaths
18th-century Irish people
19th-century Irish people
Politicians from County Kilkenny
Earls in the Peerage of Ireland
Peers of Great Britain created by George III
Lord-Lieutenants of Bedfordshire
Members of the Parliament of Great Britain for English constituencies
British MPs 1761–1768
British MPs 1768–1774
British MPs 1774–1780
British MPs 1780–1784
British MPs 1784–1790
British MPs 1790–1796
British MPs 1796–1800
Fellows of the Royal Society
John